Whitefield School is a secondary school and sixth form located in the London Borough of Barnet. In 2010, the school was in the top 1% of most improved schools in the country. Since then it has been in the top 1 or 2% of schools in the country for the value it adds to the expected progress of its students. Whitefield was one of the first schools in Barnet to convert to academy status in 2011, in order to use the freedoms granted by this status to further improve the remarkable academic performance of its students.

Location

The school is in Cricklewood, just south of the North Circular Road and west of the A41 Hendon Way.
School Entrance co-ordinates:  51, 34.395N  0, 13.143W

The nearest tube station is Brent Cross on the Northern line Edgware branch and the nearest bus station is Brent Cross Shopping Centre.

History
The school was built between 1953 and 1954 on the site of the disused Hendon Metropolitan water treatment works, part of the original Clitterhouse Farm. It was originally a Secondary Modern School and opened in autumn 1954 later than originally intended. This gave pupils transferring from other schools in the then Borough of Hendon and surrounding areas an extra three weeks summer holiday. At the time of opening it had seven 1st year classes of between thirty and forty. Classes 1 and 2 first year had French or German in their curriculum, unusual at the time. Other older pupils transferred in to second, third and fourth year classes.

In 1954 the school grounds extended only as far east as the Clitterhouse Brook, a small tributary of the river Brent. Many years later the grounds extended east beyond the Brook to the boundary with Hendon Way. This area was the overgrown disused site of the settling ponds of the old water treatment works which were transformed into school playing fields.
Some time later, the playing field area west of Hendon Way was given up for development of Tesco Super store and Hendon Leisure Centre and the eastern school boundary became once again the Clitterhouse Brook.

The first headmaster was Mr Haley who until then, had been headmaster at Bell Lane school, Hendon. Mr Brenig Lewis joined the school on opening as assistant head and science teacher.  He eventually became Headmaster in 1971 and remained until his retirement in 1989.

Other staff at the time of opening were Miss Hardman-Deputy Head; Mr Norman-Woodwork; Mr Ransome-Metalwork; Miss Stern-History; Mr Graves-Geography; Mr Dobbin-Science; Mr Reece-Music; Mr Hill-Maths; Mr Vincnt-Maths; Mr Brown-Geography; Mrs Siebold, an Austrian, taught German; Mr Ronald Edmanson NZ-PE (gymnastics); Mr Funk (American tempororary)- PE. There were many others whose specialities have become less well remembered: Mr Prior; Mrs Court; Mr Franklyn; Miss Swan. The original residential caretaker was a Mr Christ whose son Richard attended the school. Mr Christ had two assistant caretakers, Reg Daly and Bill Winny.

Weekend programmes
The Japanese Saturday School of London, a weekend Japanese programme, uses the Whitefield School as its Brent Campus (ブレント校舎 Burento Kōsha).

References

Academies in the London Borough of Barnet
Secondary schools in the London Borough of Barnet